The act of swallowing live goldfish was a fad popularized in American colleges in the late 1930s.

History
Although it is not clear how the fad emerged, various people have made claims. A 1963 letter to The New York Times claimed that it was started by a man named Lothrop Withington Jr.—grandnephew of the noted genealogist Lothrop Withington—who was a freshman at Harvard University and did so to win a $10 bet as part of a bid to become class president. The stunt started a competition between multiple universities such as Penn, MIT, and Harvard in an attempt to surpass one another. Women also took part in the trend, as in April 1939 when Marie Hensen from the University of Missouri School of Journalism became the first woman widely known to partake in it.

The activity even prompted the establishment of the International Goldfish Gulping Association (IGGA), which sought to determine and enforce competition standards. The last title on record went to Clark University's Joe Deliberto, who sucked down 89 goldfish. Critics of goldfish swallowing soon emerged, such as a poem condemning the practice in the Boston Herald by Eva Williams Raymond and the Society for the Prevention of Goldfish Eating, established in the spring of 1939.

Although once widely practiced, the stunt is rare today, but has made appearances in recent entertainment. In 2000, Jackass star Steve-O swallowed a live goldfish, only to regurgitate it moments later. It has even evolved into an Internet challenge called "The Goldfish Challenge", not to be confused with the challenge involving Goldfish crackers, which has earned the disapproval of PETA, citing evidence that the practice caused the animals "needless pain". Additionally, according to The Atlantic, goldfish gulping had become a "fixture of collegiate hazing rituals", and regularly listed as offenses in lawsuits against fraternities and sports teams, notably a lawsuit against 5 upperclassmen and an additional member of a former swim team in the University of Virginia.

In 2014, Jack Blowers, a 20-year-old from the United Kingdom was fined £200 and banned from owning pet animals for a year by the RSPCA for gulping down two goldfish, both of which survived, alongside aquarium water, fish food, and gravel as part of a Neknomination video on Facebook. In 2019, a 21-year-old New Jersey man was arrested and charged with cruelty to animals, improper telephone communications, and being a fugitive from justice for more than 26 months after allegedly swallowing his ex-girlfriend's goldfish in her dorm room at Louisiana State University and sending a photograph of his feces, with the caption, "Found your fish". In October 2020, the LSU goldfish incident was expunged from his record.

Another possibility in the origins of goldfish swallowing comes from Chicago bartenders, most notably Matt Schulien (who performed magic while tending bar at his family's restaurant). He would cut up carrots to look like goldfish tails. When performing the stunt, bartenders like Schulien would reach into a bowl of goldfish kept behind the bar while palming the carrot piece, placing that in between their pursed lips, using their tongues to lever it up and down to mimic the actions of a live fish, finally swallowing the carrot piece. The trick dates back to the 1920s, and some people believe that the fad could have been started by college students fooled by the trick.

According to the Smithsonian National Museum of American History, goldfish swallowing was such a craze at universities during the early 20th century that it made appearances in several news publications, including The New York Times and the Washington Post. An article in April 1939 in the Los Angeles Times called it goldfish gulping and showed a photo of someone mid-act. According to The Nashua Telegraph, a dance mimicking the goldfish gulping fad was also introduced among students, termed "doing the goldfish".

Legislation 
The stunt became so popular that Massachusetts State Senator George Krapf filed a bill to "preserve the fish from cruel and wanton consumption."

Related activities and safety 
Attempting to swallow other aquarium fish species besides goldfish can be very dangerous, because some of them (e.g. Corydoras catfish) have sharp spines that can become lodged in the throat.

See also 
 Panty raid
 Phonebooth stuffing
 Consumption of Tide Pods
 Flagpole sitting

References

External links
Goldfish swallowing at Bad Fads Museum
College Fads from The St. James Encyclopedia of Popular Culture

1930s fads and trends
Goldfish
Student culture in the United States
Cruelty to animals
Animal-based seafood
Dishes involving the consumption of live animals
Edible animals